Sugarland is the fourth studio album by English band Kissing the Pink, released in 1993 by SPV GmbH, and was their first album in seven years following 1986's Certain Things Are Likely. The album was a blend of psychedelic music and dance-pop, and it features a remix of their song "Big Man Restless" which was originally released on their debut album, Naked, 10 years prior.

The album features the return of founding member George Stewart as a songwriter, who had left the band after their 1984 album What Noise, but it is not as clear as to whether or not he played on the album as only backing vocalist Rochelle Shepherd is credited in a performing role.

The album was reissued a year later on Custer's Last Stand Records, with a different track listing, album artwork, and a new track "We Are Immortal", with the omission of the track "Big Man Restless (Remix)".

It would be their last physically-released album, and last studio album overall for 22 years until 2015's Digital People.

When asked why the album was recorded in Texas, and how the band felt about it, George Stewart said:

Track listing

Personnel
Credits are adapted from the Sugarland liner notes.
Rochelle Shepherd – backing vocals
Kissing the Pink – producer
Jury-Bailey – cover design

References

External links

1993 albums
Kissing the Pink albums